Divorce is an American comedy-drama television series created by Sharon Horgan, set in Hastings-on-Hudson, New York, and starring Sarah Jessica Parker and Thomas Haden Church as a middle-aged divorcing couple. The series premiered on HBO on October 9, 2016. The pilot episode was written by Horgan and directed by Jesse Peretz. On November 14, 2016, HBO renewed the show for a second season, which premiered on January 14, 2018. On November 2, 2018, HBO renewed the show for a third season, which was later announced on its premiere date to be the final season.

Cast

Main
Sarah Jessica Parker as Frances Dufresne, a married woman who has an affair which precipitates her divorce 
Thomas Haden Church as Robert Dufresne, Frances' hapless husband who discovers the affair and divorces her
Molly Shannon as Diane, Frances' high-strung friend
Talia Balsam as Dallas Holt, Frances' close friend
Tracy Letts as Nick, Diane's husband (seasons 1–2; guest season 3)
Sterling Jerins as Lila Dufresne, Frances and Robert's daughter
Charlie Kilgore as Tom Dufresne, Frances and Robert's son
Becki Newton as Jackie Giannopolis, Robert's new girlfriend and later wife (season 3; recurring season 2)

Recurring
Jemaine Clement as Julian Renaut
Alex Wolff (seasons 1-2), Isaac Josephthal (season 3) as Cole Holt
Dean Winters as Tony Silvercreek
Jeffrey DeMunn as Max Brodkin
Roslyn Ruff as Sylvia
Yul Vazquez as Craig Anders
Keisha Zollar as Grace
Jorge Chapa as Sebastian
Danny Garcia as Gabriel
James Lesure as Henry

Production
In December 2014, it was announced Sarah Jessica Parker had been cast in the pilot and would also serve as an executive producer. In February 2015, Molly Shannon, Thomas Haden Church and Jemaine Clement joined the series. In November 2015, Alex Wolff joined the cast. In December 2015, Sterling Jerins joined the cast.

Episodes

Season 1 (2016)

 Notes

Season 2 (2018)

Season 3 (2019)

Broadcast
The series premiered in the United Kingdom on Sky Atlantic on October 11, 2016. It premiered in Australia on Showcase on October 12, 2016.

Reception

Critical reception
Divorce has received mixed to positive reviews from television critics. On Rotten Tomatoes the first season has a rating of 63%, based on 51 reviews, with an average rating of 5.8/10. The site's critical consensus reads, "While the execution borders on superficial, the dark humor and character chemistry in Divorce hit the mark." On Metacritic, the first season has a score of 60 out of 100, based on 37 critics, indicating "mixed or average reviews".

Accolades

References

External links

2010s American comedy-drama television series
2016 American television series debuts
2019 American television series endings
Adultery in television
English-language television shows
HBO original programming
Television series about dysfunctional families
Television series created by Sharon Horgan
Television shows set in New York (state)
Television series about divorce
Television series by Kapital Entertainment